Wright Air Service is an American commuter airline based in Fairbanks, Alaska, United States. It was established by Al Wright and started operations in 1967. It is located off the east ramp near the Fairbanks International Airport. The president of the company was Robert Bursiel, but the company was recently bought out by a new owner in 2017.

History  
Bob Bursiel, former president, started as a pilot for Wright's in 1968. As the company grew, more aircraft joined the fleet. Bursiel then became the owner of Wright's in 1982, changing the company's focus from game surveys, short fields, and Trans-Alaska Pipeline construction support, to carrying passengers and mail to the remote villages of Alaska.

Fleet 
The Wright Air Service fleet includes the following aircraft:

On 7 July 2020, Wright Air acquired 4 Cessna planes at Ravn Alaska's bankruptcy auction.

Destinations 

Wright Air Service operates scheduled passenger flights to the following locations in Alaska (as of July 2020):
 Allakaket (AET) - Allakaket Airport (to Bettles, Fairbanks)
 Atqasuk (ATK) - Atqasuk Airport (to Wainwright, Utqiagvik)
 Anaktuvuk Pass (AKP) - Anaktuvuk Pass Airport (to Bettles, Coldfoot, Fairbanks)
 Arctic Village (ARC) - Arctic Village Airport (to Fairbanks, Fort Yukon, Venetie)
 Bettles (BTT) - Bettles Airport (to Allakaket, Anaktuvuk Pass, Fairbanks)
 Coldfoot (CXF) - Coldfoot Airport
 Chalkyitsik (CIK) - Chalkyitsik Airport
 Deadhorse (SCC) - Deadhorse Airport (To Fairbanks, Nuiqsut, Utqiagvik)
 Birch Creek (KBC) - Birch Creek Airport (to Fairbanks, Venetie)
 Fairbanks (FAI) - Fairbanks International Airport (hub)
 Fort Yukon (FYU) - Fort Yukon Airport (to Arctic Village, Birch Creek, Fairbanks, Venetie)
 Galena (GAL) - Edward G. Pitka Sr. Airport (to Kaltag)
 Hughes (HUS) - Hughes Airport (to Fairbanks, Tanana)
 Huslia (HSL) - Huslia Airport (to Fairbanks, Hughes, Tanana, Ruby)
 Kaltag (KAL) - Kaltag Airport (to Nulato)
 Koyukuk (KYU) - Koyukuk Airport (to Huslia)
 Lake Minchumina (LMA) - Minchumina Airport (to Fairbanks)
 Nuiqsut (NUI) - Nuiqsut Airport (to Deadhorse, Utqiagvik)
 Nulato (NUL) - Nulato Airport (to Koyukuk)
 Point Hope, Alaska (PHO) - Point Hope Airport (to Point Lay, Utqiagvik)
 Point Lay, Alaska (PIZ) - Point Lay Airport (to Point Hope, Utqiagvik)
 Ruby (RBY) - Ruby Airport (to Fairbanks)
 Tanana (TAL) - Ralph M. Calhoun Memorial Airport (to Fairbanks, Hughes, Huslia)
 Utqiagvik (BRW) - Wiley Post - Will Rogers Memorial Airport (hub)
 Venetie (VEE) - Venetie Airport (to Arctic Village, Birch Creek, Fairbanks, Fort Yukon)
 Wainwright (AIN) - Wainwright Airport (to Atqasuk, Utqiagvik)

Wright Air Service also provides charter service.

References

External links
 Wright Air Service, Inc.
 Photo of Wright Air Service timetable
 Photo of Wright Air Service terminal in Fairbanks
 Wright Air Service photos

Airlines established in 1967
Airlines based in Alaska
Regional airlines of the United States
1967 establishments in Alaska